XHCME-FM is a radio station in Melchor Ocampo, State of Mexico. Broadcasting on 103.7 FM, XHCME is owned by Grupo Siete and is known as Crystal with an older-leaning Regional Mexican format.

History
XHCME received its concession on August 5, 1994. It was owned by Carlos Rafael González Aragón Ortíz and originally to be located in Coacalco, where it maintains its studios. Grupo Siete operates XHCME as a rimshot into the Mexico City area.

On July 1, 2017, XHCME changed formats to Crystal, reviving a name used before by Grupo Siete stations including in Mexico City and Toluca.

Gallery

References

Radio stations in the State of Mexico
Coacalco de Berriozábal